The Satu Mare Synagogue or Decebal Street Synagogue located in Satu Mare, Romania, was built in Moorish style at the end of the 19th century. It has a tripartite facade, with the prayer house and the temple beside the facade.

References

19th-century synagogues
Synagogues in Romania
Buildings and structures in Satu Mare
19th-century establishments in Romania
Moorish Revival synagogues